The corno da tirarsi ("pull horn") is a Baroque brass instrument. Johann Sebastian Bach wrote for the instrument when he was working in Leipzig, and it appears to have been played for him by Gottfried Reiche. 
It has been stated that it appears in four Bach cantatas. 
However, it is only called for in three cantatas by name, BWV 46, 162 and 67. Aside from its appearance in the works of Bach, there is no other evidence of its existence – Picon states "No… corno da tirarsi instrument remains. Nor some dictionary article, maker's bill, player's list, picture or document of any kind that would bring proof of the actual existence of the instrument. The reality of the corno da tirarsi is only documented (as far as we know) by its music – and that by a single composer."

Its characteristics are debated, but it was most likely a horn that resembled the "Inventions" horn of the late 18th century: "a freely-moving,  double (cylindrical) tuning slide positioned diametrically across its circular body". It also may have been a slide trumpet.

References

Baroque instruments
Brass instruments